The Banana Boat Team, Banana Boat Squad or Banana Boat Crew is a hypothetical pop culture NBA superteam, consisting of LeBron James, Dwyane Wade, Carmelo Anthony, and Chris Paul.

History
The Banana Boat team concept first formed after a photo surfaced of James, Wade, Paul, and Wade's wife Gabrielle Union on vacation in 2015. Anthony, while not featured in the picture, was on vacation with them at the time, and is considered the 'fourth member' of the Banana Boat Team. The four NBA superstars have been friends since they were teenagers, and have consistently gone on vacation together. They also played together on the 2008 Olympic Gold Medal team.

In the summer of 2010, James and Wade teamed up on the Miami Heat, with whom they won two NBA titles. Chris Bosh was also a member of this team, forming what many referred to as the "Big Three".

During the 2014–15 NBA season, James was asked if he was close to any of his teammates on the Cleveland Cavaliers. He responded that he only had three people he considered close friends in the NBA, and named Anthony, Paul and Wade.

In the summer of 2016, Wade posted on Snapchat that ‘The Banana Boys are reunited.' Snapchat gave the group their own "Banana Boys" Snapchat filter. That same year, the four stars were on stage during the ESPY awards to address social injustice.

That same year, James expressed great interest in forming a superteam in Los Angeles with the Lakers. 
Chris Paul also expressed interest in forming the team. James was quoted saying "I really hope that, before our career is over, we can all play together," creating many rumors of the possibility of a superteam playing together.

In the 2017 NBA offseason, James and Wade joined forces in Cleveland. Chris Paul was traded to the Houston Rockets, and Carmelo Anthony was traded to the Oklahoma City Thunder. On July 23, 2018, Anthony agreed to join Paul on the Rockets after signing a one-year deal at the veteran's minimum of $2.4 million. After playing ten games with the Rockets, he was traded to the Chicago Bulls on January 21, 2019, who waived him shortly after. Anthony did not find a team to start the 2019-20 NBA season but got picked up by the Portland Trail Blazers a few weeks into November. On August 4th, 2021, Anthony joined LeBron's Lakers.

On February 20, 2022, all four stars posed for photos together as part of the NBA 75 celebration with the caption to an NBA official Instagram photo stating “From teens to legends, a brotherhood!”  This marks the first time the NBA has officially acknowledged the group and their significance together.

With Wade's retirement after the 2018-19 NBA season, all four players joining forces is no longer a feasible possibility.

References

Basketball culture
LeBron James
Nicknamed groups of NBA players
Quartets